Papilio erskinei is a species of swallowtail butterfly from the genus Papilio that is found on Ugi Island.

Taxonomy
Formerly ranked as a subspecies of Papilio bridgei. This was revised by Tennent, W.J. (1999).

Papilio erskinei  is a member of the aegeus  species-group. The clade members are
Papilio aegeus Donovan, 1805
Papilio bridgei Mathew, 1886
 ? Papilio erskinei Mathew, 1886
Papilio gambrisius Cramer, [1777]
Papilio inopinatus Butler, 1883
Papilio ptolychus Godman & Salvin, 1888
Papilio tydeus C. & R. Felder, 1860
Papilio weymeri Niepelt, 1914
Papilio woodfordi Godman & Salvin, 1888

References

External links
Papilio erskinei, Butterfly Corner

erskinei
Butterflies described in 1886